WJFC (1480 AM, "Lakeway Connection") is a radio station broadcasting a classic country music format. Licensed to Jefferson City, Tennessee, United States, the station is currently owned by Lakeway Broadcasting, LLC.

References

External links
 

Country radio stations in the United States
JFC
Jefferson County, Tennessee